Leading Vision is the second full-length album by technical death metal band Gorod. It is the last album to feature drummer Sandrine.

Track listing 
Recorded & mixed at BUD Records Studios, 
Mastered at Visceral Sound Studios by Scott Hull

Personnel 
Guillaume Martinot - vocals 
Arnaud Pontaco - guitar
Mathieu Pascal - guitar
Benoit Claus - bass
Sandrine - drums

References

2006 albums
Willowtip Records albums
Candlelight Records albums
Gorod (band) albums